John Edward Robinson (12 February 1849 – 16 February 1922) was a missionary bishop of the Methodist Episcopal Church, elected in 1904.

Birth and family
John was born in Gort, County Galway, Ireland (28 miles north of Limerick).  His parentage was English, the son of James and Jane Robinson.  John was fatherless at the age of six.  He came to the U.S. in 1865.  He married Retta Terry on 15 November 1876.  They had the following children:  Ruth E., Helen E., John F., Bessie E., Flora L. and Muriel E.

Education
John was converted to the Christian faith while a teacher of boys at the 104th St. Methodist Church in New York City.  He graduated from Drew Theological Seminary in 1874.  He also received a D.D. degree from Albion College in 1902.

Ordained ministry and missionary service

Robinson went to India in 1874 as a missionary.  His appointments were as follows: Hyderabad (1874–77), Bangalore (1877–80), and Rangoon, Burma (1880–86).  He then became the presiding elder of the Burma District (1884–86).  He was appointed to Simla in 1886, but then again as a presiding elder, this time of the Bombay District (1887–96).  He was presiding elder then of the Asansol District (1896-00) and the Calcutta District (1900–04).

Robinson also served as the editor of the Burmah Evangelist (1884–87) and of the Indian Witness (1896–1904).

Episcopal ministry
The Rev. Dr. John Edward Robinson was elected the Missionary Bishop for Southern Asia in 1904.  In his theology, Bishop Robinson was considered "liberal evangelical."

See also
 List of bishops of the United Methodist Church

Notes

Selected writings
 Apostolic Succession Refuted, Rangoon, 1884
 The Rise and Progress of Methodism, 1899

References
 "Robinson, John Edward" in The New Schaff-Herzog Encyclopedia of Religious Knowledge, Samuel Macauley Jackson, D.D., LL.D., Editor-in-Chief, Grand Rapids, Michigan:  Baker Book House, 1954, Vol. X, p. 61.
 "ROBINSON, Rev. Bishop John Edward, D.D." in Who's Who in American Methodism, Carl F. Price, Compiler and Editor, New York:  E.B. Treat & Co., 1916, p. 186.

1849 births
American expatriates in India
American Methodist missionaries
American people of English descent
Converts to Methodism
Editors of Christian publications
Methodist missionaries in India
People from County Galway
Irish emigrants to the United States (before 1923)
Methodist writers
Drew University alumni
1922 deaths
Methodist missionaries in Myanmar
Albion College alumni